Siedlec may refer to the following places in Poland:
Siedlec, Lower Silesian Voivodeship (south-west Poland)
Siedlec, Łęczyca County in Łódź Voivodeship (central Poland)
Siedlec, Pajęczno County in Łódź Voivodeship (central Poland)
Siedlec, Bochnia County in Lesser Poland Voivodeship (south Poland)
Siedlec, Kraków County in Lesser Poland Voivodeship (south Poland)
Siedlec, Tarnów County in Lesser Poland Voivodeship (south Poland)
Siedlec, Gostyń County in Greater Poland Voivodeship (west-central Poland)
Siedlec, Poznań County in Greater Poland Voivodeship (west-central Poland)
Siedlec, Wolsztyn County in Greater Poland Voivodeship (west-central Poland)
Siedlec, Gmina Janów in Silesian Voivodeship (south Poland)
Siedlec, Gmina Mstów in Silesian Voivodeship (south Poland)
Siedlec, Lubusz Voivodeship (west Poland)
Siedlec, Nysa County in Opole Voivodeship (south-west Poland)
Siedlec, Strzelce County in Opole Voivodeship (south-west Poland)